is a Japanese epic novel written by Eiji Yoshikawa, about the life and deeds of legendary Japanese swordsman Miyamoto Musashi.

The book follows Shinmen Takezō starting after the Battle of Sekigahara. It follows his life after the monk Takuan forces him to reinvent himself as Miyamoto Musashi. He wanders around Japan training young pupils, getting involved in feuds with samurai and martial arts schools, and finding his way through his romantic life.

It was originally released as a serial in the Japanese newspaper Asahi Shimbun, between 1935 and 1939. It has been re-released in book format, most of which are collections of several volumes, which compile the many newspaper strips. With an estimated 120 million copies sold, it is one of the best-selling book series in history.

Introduction
It is a fictionalized account of the life of Miyamoto Musashi, author of The Book of Five Rings and arguably the most renowned Japanese swordsman who ever lived.

The novel has been translated into English by Charles S. Terry, with a foreword by Edwin O. Reischauer, published by Kodansha International under .

The long epic (over 900 pages, abridged, in the English version) comprises seven "books" detailing the exploits of Miyamoto Musashi, beginning just after the battle of Sekigahara, following his journeys and the many people who become important in his life, and leading up to his climactic duel with Sasaki Kojiro on Ganryujima (Ganryu or Funa Island). Kojiro's cruelty contrasts with Musashi's reflective and selfless nature. 
Musashi becomes famous during the course of the novel as he searches for both perfection in swordsmanship and in consciousness. Innovating Japanese swordsmanship, he invents the style of simultaneously wielding both the katana and the wakizashi, something unheard of at that time in Japanese history.
Chance, as well as the characters' very different life decisions, give to the book a philosophical dimension that is revealed in its ending.

Table of Contents (Abridged Edition)
Chapters per book

Book 1 — Earth
 The Little Bell
 The Comb
 The Flower Festival
 The Dowager's Wrath
 The Art of War
 The Old Cryptomeria Tree
 The Rock and the Tree
 The Birth of Musashi

Book 2 — Water
 The Yoshioka School
 The Wheel of Fortune
 Encounter and Retreat
 The Water Sprite
 A Spring Breeze
 The Hōzōin
 Hannya Plain
 The Koyagyū Fief
 The Peony
 Jōtarō's Revenge
 The Nightingales

Book 3 — Fire
 Sasaki Kojirō
 Reunion in Osaka
 The Handsome Young Man
 The Seashell of Forgetfulness
 A Hero's Passing
 The Drying Pole
 Eagle Mountain
 The Mayfly in Winter
 The Pinwheel
 The Flying Horse
 The Butterfly in Winter
 The Announcement
 The Great Bridge at Gojō Avenue

Book 4 — Wind
 The Withered Field
 A Man of Parts
 Too Many Kojirōs
 The Younger Brother
 A Mother's Love
 The Urbane Craftsman
 Reverberations in the Snow
 The Elegant People
 The Broken Lute
 A Sickness of the Heart
 The Scent of Aloeswood
 The Gate
 A Toast to the Morrow
 The Death Trap
 A Meeting in the Moonlight
 Stray Geese
 The Spreading Pine
 An Offering for the Dead
 A Drink of Milk
 Entwining Branches
 The Male and Female Waterfalls

Book 5 — Sky
 The Abduction
 The Warrior of Kiso
 Poisonous Fangs
 A Maternal Warning
 A One-Night Love Affair
 A Gift of Money
 A Cleansing Fire
 Playing with Fire
 A Cricket in the Grass
 The Pioneers
 Slaughter by the Riverside
 Shavings
 The Owl
 A Plate of Loaches
 Like Teacher, Like Pupil
 Mountain Devils
 First Planting
 The Flies
 The Soul Polisher
 The Fox
 An Urgent Letter
 Filial Piety
 Spring Shower in Red
 A Block of Wood
 The Deserted Prophet
 The Talk of the Town

Book 6 — Sun and Moon
 A Chat with the Men
 Buzzing Insects
 The Eagle
 Green Persimmons
 Eyes
 Four Sages with a Single Light
 The Locust Tree
 Tadaaki's Madness
 The Poignancy of Things
 Two Drumsticks
 The Demon's Attendant
 Brother Disciples
 The Pomegranate
 Land of Dreams
 The Challenge
 The Gateway to Glory
 The Sound of Heaven

Book 7 — The Perfect Light
 The Runaway Ox
 Hemp Seed
 Sweepers and Salesmen
 A Pear Blossom
 The Port
 The Writing Teacher
 The Circle
 Shikama Blue
 The Mercy of Kannon
 The Tides of Life
 The Evening Boat
 A Falcon and a Woman
 Before the Thirteenth Day
 At Daybreak
 The Marriage
 The Soul of the Deep

Release details
 .
 
 .
 .

See also

 Samurai Trilogy — film adaptation of the novel
 Vagabond — manga adaptation of the novel

References

1935 novels
Japanese serial novels
Historical novels
Novels first published in serial form
Works originally published in Asahi Shimbun
Novels set in Japan
Japanese novels adapted into films
Cultural depictions of Miyamoto Musashi